Sean Nolan (born July 18, 1972) is an American water polo player. He competed in the men's tournament at the 2000 Summer Olympics.

See also
 List of men's Olympic water polo tournament goalkeepers

References

External links
 

1972 births
Living people
Sportspeople from Palo Alto, California
American male water polo players
Water polo goalkeepers
Olympic water polo players of the United States
Water polo players at the 2000 Summer Olympics